Daniel Gordon Dorrance (March 13, 1811 Peterboro, Madison County, New York - March 26, 1896 Vernon, Oneida County, New York) was an American politician from New York.

Life
He was the son of John Dorrance MD (1778–1857) and Mary (Thompson) Dorrance.

He was a member of the New York State Assembly (Oneida Co.) in 1846.

He was a member of the New York State Senate (19th D.) in 1854 and 1855.

He was buried at the Oneida Castle Cemetery in Oneida.

Sources
The New York Civil List compiled by Franklin Benjamin Hough (pg. 137, 140, 232 and 271; Weed, Parsons and Co., 1858)

External links

1811 births
1896 deaths
Members of the New York State Assembly
New York (state) state senators
People from Vernon, New York
People from Peterboro, New York
New York (state) Whigs
19th-century American politicians